Jan Boedts (1904–1973) was a Belgian sculptor. His work was part of the sculpture event in the art competition at the 1936 Summer Olympics.

References

1904 births
1973 deaths
20th-century Belgian sculptors
20th-century Belgian male artists
Belgian sculptors
Olympic competitors in art competitions